Francis Scott (1876 – 3 July 1937) was an English professional footballer who made 45 appearances in the Football League playing as an inside forward for Lincoln City. He also played for Southern League clubs New Brompton and Brighton & Hove Albion, for whom he was top scorer in the 1902–03 season with 31 goals in all competitions. He was born in Boultham, Lincoln, Lincolnshire, in 1876 and died in Lincoln in 1937.

References

1876 births
Date of birth missing
1937 deaths
Sportspeople from Lincoln, England
English footballers
Association football forwards
Lincoln City F.C. players
Gillingham F.C. players
Brighton & Hove Albion F.C. players
English Football League players
Southern Football League players
Association football midfielders